Red Star is a digital-only EP by Third Eye Blind released in 2008 in anticipation of their fourth studio album Ursa Major.  Previews of the songs on the EP were posted to the band's myspace page on November 12, 2008, and it was released officially on November 18, 2008 through all major digital music outlets. Also released with the EP was a music video for "Non-Dairy Creamer" featuring Third Eye Blind's recent Japan tour.

Track listing

References 

Third Eye Blind albums
2008 debut EPs